The Most Excellent Order of the Royal Family of Malaysia is a Malaysian federal award conferred to the Malay rulers who were appointed as the Yang di-Pertuan Agong of Malaysia. It only has one rank.

This award is limited to 10 living recipients only at any time. The award was instituted on 18 April 1966 and gazetted on 30 June 1966. The last award was granted in 2019. It does not carry any title.

Insignia

The D.K.M. comprises a collar, a star and a badge.

The collar is made of gold-plated silver. The gold star is in a radial form with an embossed fern motive.

The sash is made from red silk and the end is tied with a ribbon. The badge is also in a radial form and surmounted by a hibiscus. It suspends from the Malaysian Royal Crown.

The sash is worn from the left shoulder to the right hip.

Recipients
Official source

D.K.M.
The recipients do not receive any title. 
 1960: Putra of Perlis
 1965: Ismail Nasiruddin of Terengganu
 1970: Abdul Halim of Kedah
 1975: Yahya Petra of Kelantan
 1980: Ahmad Shah of Pahang
 1984: Iskandar of Johor
 1989: Azlan Shah of Perak
 1994: Ja'afar of Negeri Sembilan
 1999: Salahuddin of Selangor
 2002: Sirajuddin of Perlis
 2007: Mizan Zainal Abidin of Terengganu
 2017: Muhammad V of Kelantan
 2019: Abdullah of Pahang

Currently living recipients
 Sirajuddin of Perlis 
 Mizan Zainal Abidin of Terengganu 
 Muhammad V of Kelantan
 Abdullah of Pahang

References

External links
 Malaysia: Most Excellent Order of the Royal Family of Malaysia

 
Royal Family
Monarchs of Malaysia
Orders of chivalry awarded to heads of state, consorts and sovereign family members
1966 establishments in Malaysia
Awards established in 1966